Breathing Space is a band. It may also refer to:

Breathing Space (organisation), a mental health counselling service
Breathing Space, a 2005 album by British keyboardist Iain Jennings
"Breathing Space", a song by Opshop from You Are Here
"Breathing Space", a song by Pet Shop Boys from Elysium